Borlänge Tidning (BT) is a daily newspaper based in Dalarna, Sweden.

History and profile
BT was founded by Axel Lidman in 1885. The paper is sold and delivered to readers in Borlänge, Hedemora and Säter. It is a local edition of Dalarnas Tidningar, Sweden's second largest provincial newspaper. BT has never had a specific political affiliation, but since becoming a part of Dalarnas Tidningar, it shares editorial pages with liberal Falu-Kuriren. All papers are part of Dalarnas Tidningar AB which is a subsidiary of MittMedia AB.

In 2005 BT had a circulation of 15,600 copies.

See also
List of Swedish newspapers

References

External links
 

1885 establishments in Sweden
Dalarna County
Mass media in Borlänge
Daily newspapers published in Sweden
Publications established in 1885
Swedish-language newspapers